Dopaminergic pathways (dopamine pathways, dopaminergic projections) in the human brain are involved in both physiological and behavioral processes including movement, cognition, executive functions, reward, motivation, and neuroendocrine control. Each pathway is a set of projection neurons, consisting of individual dopaminergic neurons.  

The four major dopaminergic pathways are the mesolimbic pathway, the mesocortical pathway, the nigrostriatal pathway, and the tuberoinfundibular pathway.The mesolimbic pathway and the mesocortical pathway form the mesocorticolimbic system. Two other dopaminergic pathways to be considered are the hypothalamospinal tract and the incertohypothalamic pathway.

Parkinson's disease, attention deficit hyperactivity disorder (ADHD), substance use disorders (addiction), and restless legs syndrome (RLS) can be attributed to dysfunction in specific dopaminergic pathways.  

The dopamine neurons of the dopaminergic pathways synthesize and release the neurotransmitter dopamine. Enzymes tyrosine hydroxylase and dopa decarboxylase are required for dopamine synthesis. These enzymes are both produced in the cell bodies of dopamine neurons. Dopamine is stored in the cytoplasm and vesicles in axon terminals. Dopamine release from vesicles is triggered by action potential propagation-induced membrane depolarization. The axons of dopamine neurons extend the entire length of their designated pathway.

Pathways

Major 

Six of the dopaminergic pathways are listed below.

Minor 
Hypothalamospinal
 Hypothalamus → Spinal cord
Incertohypothalamic
 Zona incerta → Hypothalamus
 Zona incerta → Brainstem VTA → Amygdala (mesoamygdaloid pathway)
VTA → Hippocampus
VTA → Cingulate cortex
VTA → Olfactory bulb
SNc → Subthalamic nucleus

Function

Mesocorticolimbic system 

The mesocorticolimbic system (mesocorticolimbic circuit) refers to both the mesocortical and mesolimbic pathways. Both pathways  originate at the ventral tegmental area (VTA). Through separate connections to the prefrontal cortex (mesocortical) and ventral striatum (mesolimbic), the mesocorticolimbic projection has a significant role in learning, motivation, reward, memory and movement. Dopamine receptor subtypes, D1 and D2 have been shown to have complementary functions in the mesocorticolimbic projection, facilitating learning in response to both positive and negative feedback. Both pathways of the mesocorticolimbic system are associated with ADHD, schizophrenia and addiction.

Mesocortical pathway 

The mesocortical pathway projects from the ventral tegmental area to the prefrontal cortex (VTA → Prefrontal cortex). This pathway is involved in cognition and the regulation of executive functions (e.g., attention, working memory, inhibitory control, planning, etc.) Dysregulation of the neurons in this pathway has been connected to ADHD.

Mesolimbic pathway 

Referred to as the reward pathway, mesolimbic pathway projects from the ventral tegmental area to the ventral striatum ( VTA → Ventral striatum (nucleus accumbens and olfactory tubercle). When a reward is anticipated, the firing rate of dopamine neurons in the mesolimbic pathway increases. The mesolimbic pathway is involved with incentive salience, motivation, reinforcement learning, fear and other cognitive processes. In animal studies, depletion of dopamine in this pathway, or lesions at its site of origin, decrease the extent to which an animal is willing to go to obtain a reward (e.g., the number of lever presses for nicotine or time searching for food). Research is ongoing to determine the role of the mesolimbic pathway in the perception of pleasure.

Nigrostriatal pathway 
The nigrostriatal pathway is involved in behaviors relating to movement and motivation. The transmission of dopaminergic neurons to the dorsal striatum particularly plays a role in reward and motivation while movement is influenced by the transmission of dopaminergic neurons to the substantia nigra. The  nigrostriatal pathway is associated with conditions such as Huntington's disease, Parkinson's disease, ADHD, Schizophrenia, and Tourette's Syndrome. Huntington's disease, Parkinson's disease, and Tourette's Syndrome are conditions affected by motor functioning while schizophrenia and ADHD are affected by reward and motivation functioning. This pathway also regulates associated learning such as classical conditioning and operant conditioning.

Tuberoinfundibular pathway 
The tuberoinfundibular pathway transmits dopamine the hypothalamus to the pituitary gland. This pathway also regulates the secretion of prolactin from the pituitary gland, which is responsible for breast milk production in females. Hyperprolactinemia is an associated condition caused by an excessive amount of prolactin production that is common in pregnant women.

Cortico-basal ganglia-thalamo-cortical loop 

The dopaminergic pathways that project from the substantia nigra pars compacta (SNc) and ventral tegmental area (VTA) into the striatum (i.e., the nigrostriatal and mesolimbic pathways, respectively) form one component of a sequence of pathways known as the cortico-basal ganglia-thalamo-cortical loop. The nigrostriatal component of the loop consists of the SNc, giving rise to both inhibitory and excitatory pathways that run from the striatum into the globus pallidus, before carrying on to the thalamus, or into the subthalamic nucleus before heading into the thalamus. The dopaminergic neurons in this circuit increase the magnitude of phasic firing in response to positive reward error, that is when the reward exceeds the expected reward.  These neurons do not decrease phasic firing during a negative reward prediction (less reward than expected), leading to hypothesis that serotonergic, rather than dopaminergic neurons encode reward loss (source?). Dopamine phasic activity also increases during cues that signal negative events, however dopaminergic neuron stimulation still induces place preference, indicating its main role in evaluating a positive stimulus.  From these findings, two hypotheses have developed, as to the role of the basal ganglia and nigrostiatal dopamine circuits in action selection.  The first model suggests a "critic" which encodes value, and an actor which encodes responses to stimuli based on perceived value.  However, the second model proposes that the actions do not originate in the basal ganglia, and instead originate in the cortex and are selected by the basal ganglia.  This model proposes that the direct pathway controls appropriate behavior and the indirect suppresses actions not suitable for the situation.  This model proposes that tonic dopaminergic firing increases the activity of the direct pathway, causing a bias towards executing actions faster.

These models of the basal ganglia are thought to be relevant to the study of OCD, ADHD, Tourette syndrome, Parkinson's disease, schizophrenia, and addiction.  For example, Parkinson's disease is hypothesized to be a result of excessive inhibitory pathway activity, which explains the slow movement and cognitive deficits, while Tourettes is proposed to be a result of excessive excitatory activity resulting in the tics characteristic of Tourettes.

Regulation

The ventral tegmental area and substantia nigra pars compacta receive inputs from other neurotransmitters systems, including glutaminergic inputs, GABAergic inputs, cholinergic inputs, and inputs from other monoaminergic nuclei. The VTA contains 5-HT1A receptors that exert a biphasic effects on firing, with low doses of 5-HT1A receptor agonists eliciting an increase in firing rate, and higher doses suppressing activity.  The 5-HT2A receptors expressed on dopaminergic neurons increase activity, while 5-HT2C receptors elicit a decrease in activity.  The mesolimbic pathway, which projects from the VTA to the nucleus accumbens, is also regulated by muscarinic acetylcholine receptors.  In particular, the activation of muscarinic acetylcholine receptor M2 and muscarinic acetylcholine receptor M4 inhibits dopamine release, while muscarinic acetylcholine receptor M1 activation increases dopamine release.  GABAergic inputs from the striatum decrease dopaminergic neuronal activity, and glutaminergic inputs from many cortical and subcortical areas increase the firing rate of dopaminergic neurons.  Endocannabinoids also appear to have a modulatory effect on dopamine release from neurons that project out of the VTA and SNc.  Noradrenergic inputs deriving from the locus coeruleus have excitatory and inhibitory effects on the dopaminergic neurons that project out of the VTA and SNc. The excitatory orexinergic inputs to the VTA originate in the lateral hypothalamus and may regulate the baseline firing of VTA dopaminergic neurons.

See also 
Dopaminergic cell groups

Notes

References 

Central nervous system pathways
Dopamine